La La Land is a 2016 American romantic musical film written and directed by Damien Chazelle. The film stars Ryan Gosling and Emma Stone as a struggling jazz pianist and an aspiring actress, respectively, who meet and fall in love while pursuing their dreams in Los Angeles. John Legend, Rosemarie DeWitt, Finn Wittrock, and J. K. Simmons appear in supporting roles.

Having been fond of musicals during his time as a drummer, Chazelle first conceptualized the film alongside Justin Hurwitz while attending Harvard University together. After moving to Los Angeles in 2010, Chazelle penned the script but did not find a studio willing to finance the production without changes to his design. After the success of his film Whiplash (2014), the project was picked up by Summit Entertainment. Miles Teller and Emma Watson were originally slated to star, but after both dropped out, Gosling and Stone were cast. Filming took place in Los Angeles between August and September 2015, with the film's score composed by Hurwitz and the dance choreography by Mandy Moore.

La La Land had its premiere at the 73rd Venice International Film Festival on August 31, 2016, and was released in the United States on December 9, by Lionsgate. The film was a commercial success, grossing over $448 million worldwide on a budget of $30 million, and received universal acclaim with particular praise given to Chazelle's screenplay and direction, the performances of Gosling and Stone, score, musical numbers, cinematography, and production design. It went on to receive numerous accolades. It won a record-breaking seven awards from its seven nominations at the 74th Golden Globe Awards and received eleven nominations at the 70th British Academy Film Awards, winning five, including Best Film. The film also received a record-tying fourteen nominations at the 89th Academy Awards, winning in six categories including Best Actress for Stone and Best Director for Chazelle. In the latter category, Chazelle became the youngest winner at age 32.

A stage musical adaptation is currently in the works.

Plot

While stuck in Los Angeles traffic, aspiring actress Amelia "Mia" Dolan has a moment of road rage directed at Sebastian "Seb" Wilder, a jazz pianist. After a hard day at work, Mia's subsequent audition goes awry when the casting director takes a phone call during an emotional scene. That night, her roommates take her to a lavish party in the Hollywood Hills, promising her that someone in the crowd could jump-start her career. After her car is towed, she walks home in disappointment.

During a gig at a restaurant, Seb slips into jazz improvisation, despite the owner's warning to only play traditional Christmas pieces. Mia overhears him playing as she passes by. Moved, she enters the restaurant and observes Seb being fired for his disobedience. As he storms out, Mia attempts to compliment him, but he brushes her off. Months later, she runs into Seb at a party where he plays in a 1980s pop cover band. After the gig, they walk to their cars and 'lament wasting a lovely night together' despite their clear chemistry.

Seb arrives at Mia's workplace, and she shows him around the Warner Bros. backlot, where she works as a barista, while explaining her passion for acting. He takes her to a jazz club, describing his passion for jazz and his desire to open his own club. Seb invites Mia to a screening of Rebel Without a Cause and she accepts, forgetting a date with her boyfriend Greg. Bored with the latter date, she goes to the theater and finds Seb as the film begins. When the screening is interrupted because the film print begins to burn due to a projector malfunction, Seb and Mia spend the rest of the evening together with a romantic visit to the Griffith Observatory.

After more failed auditions, Mia decides, with Seb's encouragement, to write a one-woman play. He begins to perform regularly at a jazz club, and they move in together. Seb's former bandmate Keith invites him to be the keyboardist in his new jazz fusion band, which will give him a steady income. Although dismayed by the band's pop style, Seb signs on after overhearing Mia trying to convince her mother that he is working on his career. The band finds success, but Mia knows the band’s music is not the type of music Seb wants to perform.

During the band's first tour, Seb and Mia have an argument; she accuses him of abandoning his dreams, while he claims that she liked him more when he was unsuccessful. Two weeks later, Seb misses Mia's play due to a photoshoot he had forgotten about. The play does not go as well as planned; few people attend, and Mia overhears dismissive comments about her performance. Unable to forgive him for missing her play, Mia breaks up with Seb and moves back to her hometown of Boulder City, Nevada.

Seb receives a phone call from a prominent casting director who attended Mia's play and invites her to audition for an upcoming film. He drives to Boulder City and persuades her to attend. During the audition, Mia is asked simply to tell a story. In response, she sings about how her aunt, a former stage actress who eventually died from alcoholism, inspired her to chase her dreams. Seb, confident the audition was a success, encourages her to devote herself to acting.

Five years later, Mia is a famous actress and married to another man, with whom she has a daughter. One night, the couple stumble upon a jazz bar. Recognizing the logo she had once designed, Mia realizes that Seb has opened his own jazz club. When he notices Mia in the crowd, Seb begins to play their love theme on the piano. A dream sequence unfolds in which the two imagine what might have been had their relationship thrived along with their careers. Seb and Mia acknowledge each other with a silent exchange of smiles before she leaves.

Cast

Production

Pre-production 

As a drummer, Chazelle has a predilection for musical films. He wrote the screenplay for La La Land in 2010, when the film industry seemed out of reach for him. His idea was "to take the old musical but ground it in real life where things don't always exactly work out," and to salute creative people who move to Los Angeles to chase their dreams. He conceived the film when he was a student at Harvard University with his classmate Justin Hurwitz. The two explored the concept in their senior thesis through a low-budget musical about a Boston jazz musician, Guy and Madeline on a Park Bench. Chazelle was moved by the tradition of 1920s city-symphony films, such as Manhatta (1921) and Man with a Movie Camera (1929), that paid tribute to cities. After graduating, both moved to Los Angeles in 2010 and continued writing the script, but made a few modifications, such as altering the location to Los Angeles instead of Boston.

Rather than trying to match L.A. to the charms of Paris or San Francisco, he focused on the qualities that make the city distinctive: the traffic, the sprawl, and the skylines. The style and tone of the film were inspired by Jacques Demy's The Umbrellas of Cherbourg and The Young Girls of Rochefort, especially the latter, which was more dance and jazz-oriented. The film also makes visual allusions to Hollywood classics such as Broadway Melody of 1940, Singin' in the Rain, The Band Wagon, and An American in Paris. About An American in Paris, Chazelle commented: "That's a movie that we just pillaged.  It's an awesome example of how daring some of those old musicals really were." It shares some character development and themes with Chazelle's previous musical work, Whiplash; Chazelle said:
 "They're both about the struggle of being an artist and reconciling your dreams with the need to be human. La La Land is just much less angry about it."

He said that both films reflect his own experiences as a filmmaker working his way up the Hollywood ladder. La La Land in particular is inspired by his experience of moving from the East Coast with preconceived notions of what L.A. would be like, "that it was all just strip malls and freeways".

Chazelle was unable to produce the film for years as no studio was willing to finance an original contemporary musical with no familiar songs. It is also a jazz musical, which The Hollywood Reporter called an "extinct genre". He believed that since he and Hurwitz were unknown at that time, it might have made financiers dubious about the project's potential. Gosling's character Sebastian holds a view of the jazz of the past being superior. According to an article by Anthony Carew, Chazelle wrote this character trait as a reflection of "[his] own relationship with the past and with jazz, too".   Chazelle found producers through friends who introduced him to Fred Berger and Jordan Horowitz. With the two producers on board, the script went to Focus Features at a budget of around $1 million. The studio demanded alterations: the male lead was asked to be changed from a jazz pianist to a rock musician, the complicated opening number had to be altered, and the story's bittersweet ending needed to be dropped. Chazelle scrapped the project and moved on.

Chazelle later wrote Whiplash, which was an easier concept to sell and a less risky investment. After Whiplash was well received by critics upon its premiere at the 2014 Sundance Film Festival in January, Chazelle continued his efforts to bring La La Land to the big screen. A year later, when Whiplash earned five Oscar nominations at the 87th Academy Awards, including Best Picture, and grossed nearly $50 million worldwide off a $3.3 million production budget, Chazelle and his project began to attract attention from studios.

Five years after Chazelle wrote the script, Summit Entertainment and Black Label Media, along with producer Marc Platt, agreed to invest in La La Land and distribute it. They had been impressed by the critical and commercial success of Whiplash. Lionsgate's Patrick Wachsberger, who previously had worked on the Step Up franchise, pushed Chazelle to increase the film's budget since he felt high-quality musicals could not be made cheaply.

Casting 
Miles Teller and Emma Watson were originally slated to star in the leading roles. Watson dropped out due to her commitments to Disney's live-action Beauty and the Beast remake (2017), while Teller exited via long contract negotiations. Coincidentally, Gosling turned down the Beast role in Beauty and the Beast in favor of La La Land. Chazelle subsequently decided to make his characters somewhat older, with experience in struggling to make their dreams, rather than younger newcomers just arriving in Los Angeles.

Emma Stone plays Mia, an aspiring actress in Los Angeles. Stone has loved musicals since she saw Les Misérables when she was eight years old. She said "bursting into song has always been a real dream of mine", and her favorite film is the 1931 Charlie Chaplin romantic comedy City Lights. She studied pom dancing as a child, with a year of ballet. She moved to Hollywood with her mother at age fifteen to pursue a career, and struggled constantly to get an audition during her first year. When she did, she often was turned away after singing or saying just one line. Stone drew from her own experiences for her character of Mia, and some were added into the film.

She met Chazelle in 2014 while she was making her Broadway debut in Cabaret. Chazelle and Hurwitz saw her perform on a night when the actress had a cold. She met with Chazelle at Brooklyn Diner in New York City, where the director outlined his vision for the planned film. Stone gained confidence from performing in Cabaret to handle the demands of the film. In preparation for her role, Stone watched some of the musical movies that inspired Chazelle, including The Umbrellas of Cherbourg and Fred Astaire and Ginger Rogers collaborations. Stone accepted the offer because Chazelle was so passionate about the project.

Ryan Gosling plays Sebastian, a jazz pianist. Like Stone, Gosling drew from his own experiences as an aspiring artist. One incident was used for Mia. Gosling was performing a crying scene in an audition and the casting director took a phone call during it, talking about her lunch plans while he was emoting. Chazelle met with Gosling at a bar near the latter's home in Hollywood Hills, when Gosling was about to begin filming for The Big Short.

Chazelle cast Gosling and Stone immediately after Summit bought the film. He stated that the duo "feel like the closest thing that we have right now to an old Hollywood couple" as akin to Spencer Tracy and Katharine Hepburn, Fred Astaire and Ginger Rogers, Humphrey Bogart and Lauren Bacall, and Myrna Loy and William Powell. The film marked the third collaboration between Gosling and Stone, following Crazy, Stupid, Love (2011) and Gangster Squad (2013). Chazelle asked the two about their audition disasters when they were both trying to make it. Both learned to sing and dance for the film's six original tunes.

The rest of the cast – J. K. Simmons, Sonoya Mizuno, Jessica Rothe, Callie Hernandez, Finn Wittrock, Rosemarie DeWitt, John Legend, Jason Fuchs, Meagen Fay – were announced between July and August 2015.

The film was choreographed by Mandy Moore. Rehearsals took place at a production office in Atwater Village, Los Angeles over the span of three to four months, beginning in May 2015. Gosling practiced piano in one room, Stone worked with Moore in another, and costume designer Mary Zophres had her own corner of the complex. Gosling, with no previous experience, had to learn how to play the piano, as no hand models were used. Moore emphasized working on emotion rather than technique, which Stone said was key when they filmed the Prius car scene. To help his cast and crew get their creative mode flowing, Chazelle held screenings on the soundstages every Friday night of classical films that had inspired him for the film, including The Umbrellas of Cherbourg, Singin' in the Rain, Top Hat, and Boogie Nights.

Filming

From the beginning, Chazelle wanted the film's musical numbers to be filmed "head to toe" and performed in a single take, like those of the 1930s works of Fred Astaire and Ginger Rogers. He also wanted the film to emulate the widescreen, CinemaScope look of 1950s musicals such as It's Always Fair Weather. Consequently, the movie was shot on celluloid 4-perf Super 35mm film (not digitally) with Panavision anamorphic lenses in CinemaScope's 2.55:1 aspect ratio, but not in true CinemaScope as that technology is no longer available.

Chazelle wanted Los Angeles to be the primary setting for his film, commenting that "there is something very poetic about the city I think, about a city that is built by people with these unrealistic dreams and people who kind of just put it all on the line for that." Principal photography on the film officially began in the city on August 10, 2015, and filming took place in more than 60 locations both in and near Los Angeles, including the Angels Flight trolley in downtown, houses in the Hollywood Hills, the Colorado Street Bridge, the Rialto Theatre in South Pasadena, the Warner Bros. studio lot, the Grand Central Market, Hermosa Beach's Lighthouse Café, Griffith Observatory, Griffith Park, Chateau Marmont, the Watts Towers, and Long Beach, with many scenes shot in one take. It took 40 days to complete shooting, finishing in mid-September 2015.

The opening pre-credits sequence was the first to be shot, and was filmed on a closed-off portion of two carpool direct connector ramps of the Judge Harry Pregerson Interchange, connecting the I-105 Carpool Lane to the I-110 Express Lanes, leading to Downtown Los Angeles. It was filmed in a span of two days, and required more than 100 dancers. For this particular scene, Chazelle wanted to give a sense of how vast the city is. The scene was originally planned for a stretch of ground-level highway, until Chazelle decided to shoot it in the 105–110 interchange, which arcs  in the air. Production designer David Wasco said, "I thought somebody was going to fall off and get killed." Not every portion of the highway was blocked. Chazelle compared the scene to the yellow brick road leading to the Emerald City in The Wizard of Oz (1939).
 

Chazelle scouted for "old L.A." locations that were in ruins, or were perhaps razed. One such example was the use of the Angels Flight trolley, built in 1901. The funicular had been closed in 2013 after a derailment. Attempts were made to repair and re-open the railway, but to no avail. However, the production team was able to secure permission to use it for a day. Chazelle and his crew then arranged to have it run for shooting (it was re-opened to the public in 2017). Mia works at a coffee shop on the Warner Bros. studio lot; Chazelle considered studio lots to be "monuments" of Hollywood. Production designer Wasco created numerous fake old film posters. Chazelle occasionally created names for them, deciding to use the title of his first feature, Guy and Madeline on a Park Bench (2009) for one poster, which reimagines it as a 1930s musical.

The six-minute-long Prius car scene had to be completed during the brief "magic hour" moment at sunset. It took eight takes and two days to shoot it. When Ryan Gosling and Emma Stone finally nailed it, "everybody just exploded," Stone said. Since Gosling and Stone were not primarily dancers, the two made a number of mistakes, especially during long uninterrupted single-take musical numbers. However, Chazelle was very sympathetic towards them, understanding their lack of experience and not minding their errors. While shooting Sebastian and Mia's first dance together, Stone stumbled over the back of a bench, but picked right up and kept on going with the scene.

Chazelle said that the romantic dinner that Sebastian prepared for Mia was "one of the scenes that I think I wrote and rewrote and rewrote more than any other in the script". Gosling and Stone also helped create the dialogue of the scene to get it to be one of the more realistic scenes in a film filled with fantasy and fantastical elements.

Chazelle spent nearly a year editing the film with editor Tom Cross, as the two were primarily concerned with getting the tone right.

Soundtrack 

The songs and score for La La Land were composed and orchestrated by Justin Hurwitz, Chazelle's Harvard University classmate, who also worked on his two prior films. The lyrics were written by Pasek and Paul, except for "Start a Fire", which was written by John Legend, Hurwitz, Marius de Vries and Angelique Cinelu. A soundtrack album was released on December 9, 2016, by Interscope Records, featuring selections from Hurwitz's score and songs performed by the cast.

The film's opening number, "Another Day of Sun", shot as a single tracking shot on an L.A. freeway, received praise for its choreography. The songs "City of Stars" and "Audition (The Fools Who Dream)" received numerous awards.

Release 
La La Land had its world premiere as the Venice Film Festival's opening night film on August 31, 2016. The film also screened at the Telluride Film Festival, the Toronto International Film Festival, beginning September 12, 2016, the BFI London Film Festival, the Middleburg Film Festival in late October 2016, the Virginia Film Festival, held at the University of Virginia on November 6, 2016, and the AFI Fest on November 15, 2016.

The film was originally set for a July 15, 2016, release; however, in March 2016, it was announced the film would be given a limited release starting December 2, 2016, before expanding on December 16, 2016. Chazelle stated that the change was because he felt that the release date was not right for the context of the film, and because he wanted to have a slow rollout beginning with the early fall film festivals. The limited release was later moved back a week to December 9, 2016, with the wide release still being planned for December 16, 2016. Lionsgate opened the film in five locations on December 9, 2016, and expanded it to about 200 theaters on December 16, 2016, before going nationwide on December 25, 2016. The film went fully wide on January 6, 2017, with a release into select IMAX theaters a week later.

La La Land was released in the United Kingdom on January 12, 2017. The film was released in the Netherlands on December 22, 2016, and in Australia on December 26, with the rest of the territories planned for a release from mid-January 2017.

Home media 
Lionsgate released La La Land on Digital HD on April 11, 2017, and Blu-ray, Ultra HD Blu-ray and DVD on April 25, 2017.

Reception

Box office 
La La Land grossed $151.1 million in the United States and Canada and $295 million in other territories for a worldwide total of $446.1 million, against a production budget of $30 million. Deadline Hollywood calculated the net profit of the film to be $68.25 million, when factoring together all expenses and revenues for the film, making it one of the top 20 most profitable releases of 2016.

La La Land began its theatrical release with a limited release in five theaters in Los Angeles and New York City on December 9. It made $881,107 in its opening weekend, giving the film a per-theater average of $176,221, the best average of the year. In its second week of limited release, the film expanded to 200 theaters and grossed $4.1 million, finishing seventh at the box office. It was an increase of 366% from the previous week and good for a per-theater of $20,510. The following week, the film had its wide expansion to 734 theaters, grossing $5.8 million for the weekend (including $4 million on Christmas Day and $9.2 million over the four days), and finishing eighth at the box office. On January 6, 2017, the weekend of the Golden Globes, the film expanded to 1,515 theaters and grossed $10 million over the weekend, finishing fifth at the box office. In its sixth week of release, the film grossed $14.5 million (a total of $16.9 million over the four-day weekend for Martin Luther King Jr. Day), finishing second at the box office behind Hidden Figures. After receiving its 14 Oscar nominations, the film expanded to 3,136 theaters on January 27, 2017 (an increase of 1,271 from the week before) and grossed $12.1 million (up 43% from its previous week's $8.4 million). During the weekend of February 24–26 (the weekend of the Academy Awards) the film grossed $4.6 million, exactly the same amount it grossed the previous weekend. The next week, following its six Oscar wins, the film grossed $3 million.

Critical response 
La La Land received widespread critical acclaim, with praise going toward Chazelle's screenplay and direction, cinematography, music, the performances of Gosling and Stone and their chemistry. The review aggregator Rotten Tomatoes gives the film an approval rating of 91% based on 470 reviews, with an average rating of 8.7/10. The website's critical consensus reads, "La La Land breathes new life into a bygone genre with thrillingly assured direction, powerful performances, and an irresistible excess of heart." On Metacritic, the film has a weighted average score of 94 out of 100, based on 54 critics, indicating "universal acclaim". It was the third- and sixth-highest scoring film released in 2016 on each respective site. Audiences polled by CinemaScore gave the film an average grade of "A−" on an A+ to F scale, while PostTrak reported audiences gave an 81% overall positive score and a 93% "definite recommend".

Peter Travers of Rolling Stone gave La La Land four stars out of four, describing it as "a hot miracle" and complimenting its musical numbers, particularly the opening scene. He went on to name it his favorite movie of the year. Michael Phillips of the Chicago Tribune similarly lauded the opening sequence, in addition to highlighting Stone's performance, stating "she's reason enough to see La La Land." Despite being less enthusiastic about Gosling's dancing and the film's middle section, Phillips nevertheless gave the film four out of four stars, declaring it "the year's most seriously pleasurable entertainment". A.O. Scott of The New York Times praised the film, stating that it "succeeds both as a fizzy fantasy and a hard-headed fable, a romantic comedy and a showbiz melodrama, a work of sublime artifice and touching authenticity". Peter Bradshaw of The Guardian awarded the film five out of five stars, describing it as "a sun-drenched musical masterpiece." Tom Charity of Sight & Sound stated, "Chazelle has crafted that rare thing, a genuinely romantic comedy, and as well, a rhapsody in blue, red, yellow and green." Writing for The Boston Globe, Ty Burr summarized the effectiveness of the film to relate to audiences stating: "...the movie traffics in the bittersweet happiness of treasuring things that are vanishing, like the unrealized future imagined in the climactic dance number, or those inky, star-filled dance floors that go on forever in old movies, or Hollywood musicals themselves. Or jazz: Sebastian has an early moment at a nightclub where he passionately sticks up for the music he loves. 'It's dying on the vine,' he says. 'And the world says 'Let it die. It had its time.' Well, not on my watch.' In that scene, he speaks for the director. By the end of 'La La Land,' he's speaking for all of us."

While accolades from audiences and critics grew, the film received backlash due to what some considered a disproportional amount of praise. Saturday Night Live lampooned the fervor over the film with a sketch about a man arrested for thinking it was "decent... but also boring." The film was criticized by some for its treatment of race and jazz. Kelly Lawler of USA Today noted that Gosling's character has been referred to as a "white savior" by some critics, due to "his quest (and eventual success) to save the traditionally black musical genre from extinction, seemingly the only person who can accomplish such a goal." The sentiment was also expressed by Ruby Lott-Lavigna of Wired, Anna Silman of New York, and Ira Madison III of MTV News. Rex Reed of the New York Observer also took aim at the film's intention to emulate the MGM musical classics, writing that "the old-fashioned screenplay, by the ambitious writer-director Damien Chazelle, reeks of mothballs", and that "the movie sags badly in the middle, like a worn-out mattress that needs new springs". The South China Morning Post remarked that aside from its racial treatment of jazz, much of the public criticism was towards the film being "a little dull", the two leads' singing and dancing being considered unexceptional, and the lack of nuance in Stone's character, with Gosling's occasionally seen as insufferable.

Accolades 

Emma Stone won the Volpi Cup for best actress at the Venice Film Festival.

La La Land received eleven nominations at the 70th British Academy Film Awards, more than any other film of 2016. The film won in the categories of Best Film, Best Director, Best Actress in a Leading Role (for Stone), Best Cinematography, and Best Film Music.

At the 74th Golden Globe Awards, La La Land received a leading seven nominations. The film won in all seven categories for which it was nominated, setting a record for the most Golden Globes won by a single film, namely Best Motion Picture – Musical or Comedy, Best Director, Best Actor – Comedy or Musical (for Gosling), Best Actress – Comedy or Musical (for Stone), Best Screenplay, Best Original Score, and Best Original Song ("City of Stars") breaking the record One Flew Over the Cuckoo's Nest set for the most wins.

At the 89th Academy Awards, La La Land received a leading six awards, including Best Director, Best Actress (for Stone), Best Cinematography, Best Original Score, Best Original Song ("City of Stars"), and Best Production Design. The film received a total of 14 nominations, tying the record for most nominations by a single film with All About Eve (1950) and Titanic (1997). Its other nominations were Best Picture, Best Actor (for Gosling), Best Original Screenplay, Best Film Editing, Best Costume Design, a second nomination for Best Original Song ("Audition (The Fools Who Dream)"), Best Sound Editing, and Best Sound Mixing.

Best Picture Oscar gaffe
During the Oscars ceremony, presenter Faye Dunaway incorrectly announced that La La Land had won Best Picture, reading from the card Warren Beatty opened, which was actually a duplicate of the Best Actress card for Emma Stone. After the cast and crew of La La Land took the stage, it took the show's producers more than two minutes (during which nearly three speeches were made) to fix the mistake. The actual winner was Moonlight.

German television prank
In March 2017, La La Land was at the center of a prank involving Goldene Kamera, an annual German film and television award. German comedians Joko Winterscheidt and Klaas Heufer-Umlauf arranged for a Ryan Gosling impersonator to be awarded the "Best International Film" prize for La La Land. Following the event, a speaker for television broadcaster ZDF asked for the trophy to be given back, stating that La La Land had won the prize and that the trophy would be given to the real Ryan Gosling. The incident, which became known as "GoslingGate", sparked criticism of the event's concept. Media critics argued that the "Best International Film" award had only been created in an effort to get Ryan Gosling on the show, with no regards for the film's quality. The incident played a major role in the cancellation of the Goldene Kamera in 2019. In 2018, Winterscheidt and Heufer-Umlauf were awarded the Grimme Award for their media criticism.

Stage adaptation 
On February 7, 2023, it was announced that the film would be adapted into a Broadway musical by Platt and Lionsgate. Hurwitz, Pasek & Paul will return to write additional songs for the show. Bartlett Sher will direct from a book by Ayad Akhtar and Matthew Decker.

See also
 List of oldest and youngest Academy Award winners and nominees – Youngest winners for Best Director

References

External links 

 
 La La Land posters
 
 
 Official screenplay

2016 films
2010s dance films
2010s musical comedy-drama films
2016 romantic comedy-drama films
2010s romantic musical films
American dance films
American musical comedy films
American musical drama films
American romantic comedy-drama films
American romantic musical films
BAFTA winners (films)
Best Film BAFTA Award winners
Toronto International Film Festival People's Choice Award winners
Best Musical or Comedy Picture Golden Globe winners
Black Label Media films
Films about actors
Films about Hollywood, Los Angeles
Films about mass media people
Films about pianos and pianists
Films directed by Damien Chazelle
Films featuring a Best Actress Academy Award-winning performance
Films featuring a Best Musical or Comedy Actor Golden Globe winning performance
Films featuring a Best Musical or Comedy Actress Golden Globe winning performance
Films produced by Marc E. Platt
Films scored by Justin Hurwitz
Films set in Los Angeles
Films set in Nevada
Films set in studio lots
Films shot in Los Angeles
Films that won the Best Original Score Academy Award
Films that won the Best Original Song Academy Award
Films whose art director won the Best Art Direction Academy Award
Films whose cinematographer won the Best Cinematography Academy Award
Films whose director won the Best Directing Academy Award
Films whose director won the Best Direction BAFTA Award
Films whose director won the Best Director Golden Globe
IMAX films
Jazz films
Films with screenplays by Damien Chazelle
Summit Entertainment films
2016 drama films
2010s English-language films
2010s American films
Postmodern films